Mataura was a parliamentary electorate in the Southland Region of New Zealand, from 1866 to 1946.

Population centres
In the 1865 electoral redistribution, the House of Representatives focussed its review of electorates to South Island electorates only, as the Central Otago Gold Rush had caused significant population growth, and a redistribution of the existing population. Fifteen additional South Island electorates were created, including Mataura, and the number of Members of Parliament was increased by 13 to 70.

Mataura was located in the rural Southland Region. It covered the area around Invercargill (which had its own urban electorate) and settlements included Bluff, Winton, Gore, Mataura, and Edendale.

History
Mataura was first established for the 1866 general election. The first representative was Dillon Bell from 1866 until when he retired from politics at the dissolution of parliament in December 1875. Bell was succeeded by William Wood, who won the 1876 election. Wood resigned at the end of 1878, as he had been appointed to the Legislative Council.

Members of Parliament
The electorate was represented by nine Members of Parliament:

Key

Election results

1931 election

1928 election

1919 election

1899 election

1898 by-election

1890 election

1871 election

Notes

References

Historical electorates of New Zealand
Politics of Southland, New Zealand
1865 establishments in New Zealand
1946 disestablishments in New Zealand
Mataura